Jacques Chonchol (born March 26, 1926) is a politician and professor known for his work in the Chilean land reform movement of the 1960s and early 1970s. Conchol served from 1970 to 1972 as Minister of Agriculture in the government of President Salvador Allende. He took refuge in a foreign embassy during the coup and was allowed to leave Chile for Venezuela. He then moved to France. He moved back to Chile in 1994.

Prior to working in Allende's administration he was an official in the governmenrt of President Eduardo Frei Montalva.

He lived in Cuba from 1969 to 1972. Interviews conducted with him in 2013 and 2014 were published in 2016.

Books
Paysans a venir: Les societes rurales du Tiers Monde, French edition published by La Découverte (1986)
Por una nueva Reforma Agraria para Chile (2021)

References

1926 births
Living people
Ministers of Agriculture of Chile
Chilean expatriates in Cuba
Chilean expatriates in France
Chilean expatriates in Venezuela
Chilean exiles
20th-century Chilean politicians
20th-century Chilean male writers
Christian Democratic Party (Chile) politicians
Popular Unitary Action Movement politicians
Citizen Left politicians
Christian Left (Chile) politicians